Abdullin (masculine) or Abdullina (feminine) is a Russian surname, a variant of Abdulayev. It is shared by the following people:
Alexander Abdullin (born 1962), Ukrainian journalist and politician
Arslan Abdullin, Russian Men's Greco-Roman bronze medal winner at the 2012 European Wrestling Championships
Azat Abdullin, literary protégé of Maria Prilezhayeva, Russian/Soviet writer
Denis Abdullin (born 1985), Russian ice hockey player
Hesmat Abdullin, Uyghur writer
Maryam Abdullina (born 1985), Russian fashion model
Olesya Abdullina, Russian draughts player at the 2008 World Mind Sports Games
Robert Abdullin, editor of the World Economic Journal, a Russian business magazine
Rubin Abdullin, President of the Kazan Conservatory in Kazan, Russia

See also
Abdulino, a town in Orenburg Oblast, Russia
Abdullino, several rural localities in the Republic of Bashkortostan, Russia

References

Notes

Sources
И. М. Ганжина (I. M. Ganzhina). "Словарь современных русских фамилий" (Dictionary of Modern Russian Last Names). Москва, 2001. 

Russian-language surnames
